Christina Perchtold (born 11 May 1993) is an Austrian professional racing cyclist, who most recently rode for UCI Women's Team . Born in Klagenfurt, Perchtold is a sprinter that is also capable of surviving short climbs and was the winner of the Austrian National Road Race Championships in 2016.

Career
Perchtold started competing in cycling in 1998 and in her early years rode for local club RC Grafenstein in her hometown of Klagenfurt. At the age of 18 she joined the Austrian professional team Kuota Speed Kueens as a junior rider and immediately showed great talent and sprinting qualities in both national and international races. In 2011 Perchtold received first international attention as a potential coming talent when she finished fifth in the junior road race at the UCI World Championships in Copenhagen. As an elite rider she remained on the same team until 2013, which in the meantime had changed names. Perchtold herself considered quitting cycling in between, not putting full focus on her career in 2013 and 2014. After finally deciding to follow a professional career in cycling, Perchtold had her strongest year to date in 2016 where she finished third at a stage of the Giro del Trentino Alto Adige-Südtirol, winning the Austrian National Road Race Championships and being selected for Austria's team at the 2016 UCI Road World Championships in Doha, where she finished 28th.

At the end of the season, Perchtold signed a two-year contract with the Swiss  team where she was supposed to become a part of the team's sprint leadout.

Personal life
Besides her career as a cyclist, Perchtold joined the Austrian police in 2013 and became a police officer in 2016. She is a member of the cycling cadre of the Austrian ministry of the interior.

Major results
Source: 

2010
 3rd Road race, National Under-23 Road Championships
2011
 5th Road race, UCI Junior Road World Championships
2012
 3rd Time trial, National Under-23 Road Championships
2014
 2nd Road race, National Road Championships
2015
 3rd Road race, National Road Championships
2016
 1st  Road race, National Road Championships
2017
 2nd Road race, National Road Championships
 5th Overall Gracia–Orlová
2018
 6th Overall Tour of Uppsala
2019
 2nd Grand Prix Velo Alanya

References

External links
 
 

1993 births
Living people
Austrian female cyclists
Austrian police officers
Sportspeople from Klagenfurt
21st-century Austrian women